Cochylimorpha bipunctata is a species of moth of the family Tortricidae. It is found in Shanxi, China.

References

Moths described in 1996
Cochylimorpha
Moths of Asia